Timos is a Greek male given name. Notable people with the name include:

 Timos Kavakas (born 1972), Greek footballer
 Timos Perlegas (1938–1993), Greek actor

See also
 Timo

Greek masculine given names